Holy Apostles College and Seminary is a Catholic seminary in Cromwell, Connecticut.  It was founded in 1956 on a  property in Cromwell by Eusebe M. Menard to provide a program of education and formation for men intending to enter the priesthood.

History
Holy Apostles began as a college level, preparatory seminary, which Franciscan Eusebe Menard entrusted to the Missionaries of the Holy Apostles.  In 1972, Holy Apostles, in view of declining enrollment, began admitting non-seminarians, women included. In 1977 it added a Theology programme and became a major as well as a minor seminary. 

In 2012, recognizing the growing need for online undergraduate programs, Holy Apostles added undergraduate-level programs. In 2014, the State of Connecticut Office of Higher Education approved the college for a 100% online undergraduate program (both in the Associate of Arts and the Bachelor of Arts degree programs). The following year, the institution lowered its tuition 28% to $320 per credit hour because of its mission to cultivate Catholic leaders for the purpose of evangelization.

There are now 8 undergraduate programs (Associate of Arts and Bachelor of Arts) as well as the Take Credit! Program for high school juniors and seniors. Graduate degrees have been available to lay students since 1982.

In 2019, Peter S. Kucer became President/Rector of the college taking over from the long-serving Douglas Mosey (1996-2019).

Academics
Holy Apostles is accredited by the New England Commission of Higher Education. It is also approved by the Connecticut Board of Regents for Higher Education.

Members of its board of directors include the bishops of Connecticut with the Bishop of Norwich as chancellor. The institution places heavy emphasis on the academic disciplines of philosophy and theology in the context of the Catholic honors liberal arts curriculum. Half of the undergraduate courses are a part of the required core. This includes a distribution of courses in theology, philosophy, English, and history.

See also

References

External links

Catholic seminaries in the United States
Universities and colleges in Middlesex County, Connecticut
Cromwell, Connecticut
Educational institutions established in 1956
Catholic universities and colleges in Connecticut
1956 establishments in Connecticut